Sanand Salil Mitra (born 5 May 1983) is an Indian compound national archer who was twice awarded a national gold medal in the sport.

References

External links
 https://web.archive.org/web/20140130032956/http://www.dhanurved.org/

1983 births
Living people
Indian male archers
Sportspeople from Chhattisgarh